The 2014 Sam Houston State Bearkats baseball team represented Sam Houston State University in the 2014 intercollegiate baseball season. Sam Houston State competes in Division I of the National Collegiate Athletic Association (NCAA) as a member of the Southland Conference. The Bearkats play home games at Don Sanders Stadium on the university's campus in Huntsville, Texas. Third year head coach David Pierce leads the Bearkats.

Personnel

Coaches

Players

Schedule

Ranking movements

Notes

References

External links
 Official website

Sam Houston Bearkats baseball seasons
Sam Houston State
Sam Houston State
Sam Houston State